There are around 2,400 private schools in England. Many are represented by the Independent Schools Council (ISC), while around 300 independent senior schools are represented by the Headmasters' and Headmistresses' Conference (HMC), although both bodies also represent schools outside England and the United Kingdom.



This is a list of notable independent schools in England that are currently operating. It includes independent schools with heads who are members of both organisations and of others. In England and Wales, though not in Scotland or Northern Ireland, independent senior schools are sometimes referred to as public schools, while independent junior schools are sometimes known as prep schools, although both are officially designated by government agencies and their own representative bodies as independent schools.

A
Abbey School, Torquay
Abberley Hall School
 The Abbey College, Malvern, Worcestershire
 Abbey Gate College
 The Abbey School, Reading
 Abbots Bromley School for Girls
 Abbot's Hill School
 Abbotsford Preparatory School
 Abbotsholme School
 Abercorn School
 Aberdour School
 Abingdon Preparatory School
 Abingdon School
 Ackworth School
 ACS International Schools (Cobham, Egham and Hillingdon)
 Adcote School
 AKS Lytham, Lytham St. Annes
 Akeley Wood School
 Aldenham School
 Alderley Edge School for Girls
 Aldwickbury School
 Alleyn Court Prep School
 Alleyn's School, Dulwich
 All Hallows Preparatory School
 Alton School, Alton, Hampshire
 The American School In England
 Amesbury School
 Ampleforth College
 Ardingly College
 Argyle House School
 Arnold House School
 Arnold Lodge School
 The Arts Educational School, Tring Park
 The Arts Educational Schools, Chiswick
 Ashbourne College
 Ashbridge School
 Ashdown House
 Ashfold School
 Ashford School
 Ashville College
 Austin Friars St Monica's School
 Ayesha Siddiqa Girls School
 Aysgarth School

B
 Bablake School
 Bancroft's School
 Barbara Speake Stage School
 Barlborough Hall School
 Barnard Castle School
 Bassett House School
 Battle Abbey School
 Beaulieu Convent School
 Bedales School
 Bedford Girls' School
 Bedford Greenacre Independent School
 Bedford Modern School
 Bedford School
 Bedstone College
 Beech Hall School
 Beechwood Park School
 Beechwood Sacred Heart School
 Belmont Preparatory School
 Benenden School
 Berkhamsted School
 Bethany School, Goudhurst, Kent
 Birkdale School
 Birkenhead High School
 Birkenhead School
 Bishop Challoner School
 Bishop Stopford's School
 Bishop's Stortford College
 Blackheath High School
 Bloxham School
 Blundell's School
 Bolton School
 Bootham School
 Bosworth Independent College
 Bow, Durham School
 Bowbrook House School
 Box Hill School
 Bradfield College
 Bradford Grammar School
 Braeside School
 Brambletye School
 Brampton College
 Bredon School
 Brentwood School
 Bridgewater School
 Brighton and Hove High School
 Brighton College
 Brighton College Preparatory School
 Brigidine School
 Bristol Grammar School
 Bristol Cathedral School
 Brockhurst and Marlston House School
 Bromley High School
 Bromsgrove School
 Bryanston School
 Buckswood School
 Burgess Hill Girls
 Bury Grammar School
 Bute House Preparatory School for Girls

C
 Caldicott School
 Cambridge Centre for Sixth-form Studies
 Cambridge Steiner School
 Canford School
 Carfax Tutorial Establishment, Oxford 
 Carmel Christian School
 Casterton School
 Castle Court School
 Castle House School
 Caterham School
 CATS College Canterbury
 Chafyn Grove School
 Chandlings School
 Channing School
 Chard School
 Charterhouse School
 Charterhouse Square School
 Cheadle Hulme School
 Cheam School
 Cheltenham College
 Cheltenham Ladies College
 Chetham's School of Music, Manchester
 Chetwynde School, Barrow-in-Furness
 Chigwell School
 Chinthurst School
 Christ Church Cathedral School
 Christ's Hospital
 Churcher's College
 City of London Freemen's School
 City of London School
 City of London School for Girls
 Claires Court School
 Claremont Fan Court School
 Clayesmore School
 Clifton College, Bristol
 Clifton High School, Bristol
 Cobham Hall School
 Cokethorpe School
 Colchester High School
 Colfe's School
 Collingham College
 Colston's School, Bristol
 Combe Bank School
 Copthorne Preparatory School
 Cothill House
 Cottesmore School
 Cranford House School
 Cranleigh School
 Cransley School
 Crosfields School
 Croydon High School
 Culford School

D
 d'Overbroeck's College
 Dame Allan's School, Newcastle
 Danes Hill School, Oxshott, Surrey
 Daneshill School, Stratfield Turgis, Hampshire
 Darul Hadis Latifiah Northwest
 Dauntsey's School
 Dean Close School, Cheltenham
 Deepdene School
 Denstone College
 Derby Grammar School
 Derby High School, Derby
 Devonshire House Preparatory School
 Dharma Primary School
 Ditcham Park School
 Dixie Grammar School
 Dolphin School
 Dorset House School
 Donhead Preparatory School
 Douai School
 Dover College
 Downe House School
 Downsend School 
 Downside School
 Dragon School
 The Drive Prep School
 Duke of York's Royal Military School
 Dulwich College
 Dulwich College Preparatory School
 Dulwich Preparatory School
 Dumpton School
 Dunottar School
 Durham High School for Girls
 Durham School
 Durston House
 Dwight School

E
 Eagle House School
 Ealing Independent College
 Eastbourne College
 Eaton Square Upper School
 Edge Grove School
 Edgeborough School
 EF Academy
 Egerton Rothesay School
 EIFA International School London
 Ellesmere College
 Elm Green Preparatory School
 Elmhurst School for Boys, Croydon
 Elmhurst Ballet School, Edgbaston
 Elstree School
 Eltham College
 Emanuel School
 Emmanuel Christian School, Oxford
Embley
 Epsom College
 Eton College
 European School Culham
 Ewell Castle School
 Exeter School

F
 Fairfield Preparatory School
 Farleigh School
 Farlington School
 Farnborough Hill
 Felsted School
 Feltonfleet School
 Finborough School
 Finton House School
 Forest School
 Framlingham College
 Francis Holland School
 Frensham Heights School
 Fulham Preparatory School
 Fulneck School
 Fyling Hall School

G
 Gad's Hill School
 Garden House School
 Gatehouse School
 Gateways School
 Gayhurst School
 German School London
 Getter's Talmud Torah
 Giggleswick School
 Glebe House School
 Glendower Preparatory School
 Godolphin School
 Godolphin and Latymer School
 Gosfield School
 Grace Dieu Manor School
 Grange Park Preparatory School
 The Grange School, Northwich
 Grangewood Independent School
 Great Ballard School, Chichester
 Great Walstead School
 Greenacre School for Girls
 Greenfields School 
 Gresham's School
 Guildford High School
 Guru Gobind Singh Khalsa College

H
 Haberdashers' Boys' School
 Haberdashers' School for Girls
 Haileybury College
 Halliford School
 The Hall School, Hampstead
 Hall School Wimbledon
 The Hammond School
 The Hampshire School, Chelsea
 Hampton Court House
 Hampton School
 Handcross Park School
 Hanford School
 The Harrodian School
 Harrogate Ladies' College
 Harrogate Tutorial College
 Harrow School
 Harvington School
 Hazelwood School
 Headington School
 Heathcote School
 Heathfield Knoll School
 Heathfield School, Ascot
 Heathland School
 Heath Mount School
 Hemdean House School
 Hereford Cathedral Junior School
 Hereford Cathedral School
 Hereward House School
 Hethersett Old Hall School
 Highclare School
 Highfield Priory School
 Highgate School
 Hilden Grange School
 Hill House School
 Hipperholme Grammar School
 Hoe Bridge School
 Holland House School
 Hollygirt School
 Holmewood House School
 Holy Cross Preparatory School
 Hope House School
 Horris Hill School
 Huddersfield Grammar School
 Hull Collegiate School
 Hulme Grammar School, Oldham
 Hurstpierpoint College
 Hurtwood House
 Hydesville Tower School, Walsall
 Hymers College, Hull

I
 Ibstock Place School, Roehampton, London
 International Community School
 Ipswich High School
 Ipswich School
 Italia Conti Academy of Theatre Arts

J
 James Allen's Girls' School, Dulwich
 Jamiatul Ilm Wal Huda
 Japanese School in London
 John Lyon School, Harrow

K
 Keble School
 Kensington Park School
 Kensington Preparatory School
 Kent College, Canterbury
 Kent College, Pembury 
 Kew College
 Kew Green Preparatory School
 Kimbolton School
 Kimichi School
 King Alfred School, London
 King Edward VI School, Southampton
 King Edward's School, Bath
 King Edward's School, Birmingham
 King Edward VI High School for Girls, Birmingham
 King Edward's School, Godalming
 King Fahad Academy
 Kingham Hill School
 King Henry VIII Preparatory School
 King Henry VIII School, Coventry
 King's College School, Cambridge
 King's College School, Wimbledon
 King's College, Taunton
 King's Hall School
 Kingshott School
 The King's High School for Girls, Warwick
 King's House School
 King's School, Bruton
 The King's School, Canterbury
 The King's School, Chester
 The King's School, Ely
 The King's School, Gloucester
 The King's School, Macclesfield
 The King's School, Rochester
 The King's School, Witney
 The King's School, Worcester
 Kingsley School, Bideford
 The Kingsley School, Leamington Spa
 Kingston Grammar School
 Kingswood House School
 Kingswood School
 Kirkham Grammar School
 Kirkstone House School
 Knighton House
 Knightsbridge School

L
 Lady Barn House School
 Lady Eleanor Holles School
 Laleham Lea School
 Lancing College
 Lanesborough School
 Langley School, Loddon
 Lansdowne College
 Latymer Upper School
 The Laurels School
 Leeds Grammar School
 Leehurst Swan School
 Leicester Grammar School
 Leicester High School for Girls
 Leighton Park School
 Lewes Old Grammar School
 Leweston School
 The Leys School, Cambridge
 Licensed Victuallers' School
 Lichfield Cathedral School
 Lincoln Minster School
 Lingfield College
 Lochinver House School
 Lockers Park School
 Locksley Christian School
 Long Close School
 Longridge Towers School
 Lord Wandsworth College
 Loreto Preparatory School
 Loughborough Grammar School
 Loughborough High School
 Luckley House School
 Lucton School
 Ludgrove School
 Lycée Français Charles de Gaulle
 Lycée International de Londres Winston Churchill

M
 Madani Girls' School
 Magdalen College School, Oxford
 The Mall School
 Malvern College
 Malvern St James
 Manchester Grammar School
 Manchester High School for Girls
 Mander Portman Woodward
 Manor House School, Little Bookham, Surrey
 Manor Lodge School
 The Marist School, Sunninghill
 Marlborough College
 Marlborough House School
 Marymount International School, Kingston-Upon-Thames
 Mayfield School, Mayfield, East Sussex
 The Maynard School, Exeter
 Mayville High School
 Meoncross School
 Merchant Taylors' School, Northwood
 Merchant Taylors' Girls' School
 Merchant Taylors' School, Crosby
 Michael Hall School
 Milbourne Lodge School
 Mill Hill School
 Millfield
 Millfield Preparatory School
 Milton Abbey School
 Monkton Combe School
 Moor Park School
 Moreton Hall School
 Moreton Hall Preparatory School
 Mount Kelly School
 The Mount School, York
 Mount St Mary's College
 Mowden Hall School
 Moyles Court School

N
 New College School
 Newbold College
 Newcastle High School for Girls
 Newcastle School for Boys
 Newcastle Under Lyme School
 New Hall School
 Newland House School
 Newton Preparatory School
 Norland Place School
 Normanhurst School
 North Bridge House School
 North Cestrian Grammar School, Altrincham, Greater Manchester
 North London Collegiate School
 North London Grammar School
 Northampton High School
 Northwood College
 Norwich High School for Girls
 Norwich School
 Notre Dame Preparatory School
 Notre Dame School, Surrey
 Nottingham High School
 Nottingham Girls' High School
 Notting Hill & Ealing High School

O
 Oakfield Preparatory School
 Oakham School
 Oakhill School, Whalley
 Oaklands School, Loughton, Essex
 Old Buckenham Hall School
 Old Palace School (of John Whitgift)
 The Oratory School
 Orley Farm School
 Oswestry School
 Oundle School
 Our Lady of Sion School
 Our Lady's Abingdon, Oxfordshire
 Our Lady's Convent School
 Overstone Park School
 Oxford High School
 Oxford Montessori Schools

P
 Packwood Haugh School
 Padworth College
 Palmers Green High School
 Pangbourne College
 Papplewick School
 Pardes House Grammar School
 Pattison College
 Pembridge Hall School
 Pennthorpe School
 The Perse Preparatory School
 The Perse School
 The Perse School for Girls
 The Peterborough School
 The Pilgrims' School, Winchester
 Pipers Corner School
 Pitsford School
 Plymouth College
 Pocklington School
 Port Regis School
 Portsmouth Grammar School
 Portsmouth High School
 The Prebendal School
 Prestfelde School
 Princethorpe College
 Prior Park College
 Prior's Field School
 Priory School, Isle of Wight
 Priory Preparatory School, Banstead
 Purcell School
 Putney High School

Q
 Queen Anne's School
 Queen Elizabeth Grammar School, Wakefield
 Queen Elizabeth's Hospital, Bristol
 Queen Ethelburga's Collegiate
 Queen Margaret's School, York
 Queen Mary's School
 Queen's College, London
 Queen's College, Taunton
 Queen's Gate School, London
 Queenswood School
 The Queen's School, Chester
 Quinton House School

R
 Radley College
 Ratcliffe College
 Read School, Drax, North Yorkshire
 Reading Blue Coat School
 Red House School
 Redmaids' High School
 Redroofs Theatre School
 Reed's School
 Regent Independent College
 Reigate Grammar School
 Rendcomb College
 Repton Prep
 Repton School
 RGS Dodderhill
 RGS The Grange, Worcester
 Rikkyo School in England
 Ringwood Waldorf School
 Ripley Court School
 River School
 Rishworth School
 Rochester Independent College
 Roedean School
 Rokeby Preparatory School
 Rookwood School
 Rosemead Preparatory School & Nursery
 Rose Hill School
 Rossall School, Fleetwood
 Royal Ballet School
 Royal Grammar School, Guildford
 Royal Grammar School, Newcastle upon Tyne
 Royal Grammar School, Worcester
 Royal High School, Bath
 Royal Hospital School
 The Royal Masonic School for Girls
 Royal Russell School
 The Royal School, Haslemere
 Rudston Preparatory School
 Rugby School
 Rupert House School
 Ryde School With Upper Chine
 Rye St Antony School

S
 Sackville School, Hildenborough
 St Albans High School for Girls
 St. Albans School
 St Andrew's College, Cambridge
 St Andrew's School, Pangbourne
 St Andrew's School (Wantage)
 St Annes College Grammar School, Lytham St. Annes
 St Anselm's School, Bakewell
 St Anthony's School, Hampstead 
 St. Aubyns School, Rottingdean, East Sussex
 St Aubyn's School, Woodford Green, London
 St Augustine's Priory School
 St Bede's Prep School, Eastbourne
 St Benedict's School, London
 St Catherine's School, Bramley
 St Catherine's School, Twickenham
 St Christopher School, Letchworth
 St Christopher's School, Bristol
 St. Clare's, Oxford
 St Columba's College, St Albans
 St David's Prep, West Wickham, London
 St David's School, Purley, London
 St Dominic's Grammar School, Brewood
 St Dominic's Priory School, Stone
 St Dunstan's College
 St Edmund's School, Canterbury
 St Edmund's School, Hindhead
 St Edmund's College
 St Edward's School, Cheltenham
 St Edward's School, Oxford
 St Faith's School
 Saint Felix School
 St Francis' College, Letchworth
 St Gabriel's School
 St George's College, Weybridge
 St George's School, Ascot
 St George's School, Birmingham
 St George's School, Windsor
 St. Helen's School
 St Hilary's School
 St. Hilda's School, Bushey
 St Hugh's School, Faringdon, Oxfordshire
 St Hugh's School, Woodhall Spa
 St James Independent Schools
 St James' School, Grimsby
 St John's Beaumont Preparatory School
 St John's College, Portsmouth
 St John's College School
 St John's School, Billericay
 St John's School, Leatherhead
 St Joseph's College, Ipswich
 St Joseph's College, Reading
 St Joseph's In The Park
 St. Lawrence College, Ramsgate
 St Margaret's School, Bushey
 St Margaret's School Hampstead
 St Martha's Senior School
 St Martin's School, Northwood
 St Martin's School, St Martin's, Shropshire 
 St Mary's Ascot
 St Mary's College, Crosby
 St Mary's School, Calne
 St Mary's School, Cambridge
 St Mary's School, Colchester
 St Mary's School, Shaftesbury
 St Michael's Preparatory School, Otford, North Downs
 Saint Nicholas School, Old Harlow, Essex
 St Nicholas' School, Hampshire
 St Olave's School, York
 St Paul's Girls School
 St Paul's Juniors
 St Paul's
 St Peter's School, Kettering
 St Peter's School, York
 St Swithun's School, Winchester
 St Teresa's School Effingham, Surrey
 St Wilfrid's School, Exeter
 Salcombe Preparatory School
 Salesian College
 Salisbury Cathedral School
 Sancton Wood School
 Sandroyd School
 Scarborough College
 Scarisbrick Hall School
 The School of St Helen and St Katharine
 The School of the Lion, Churcham, Gloucestershire
 Seaford College
 Sedbergh School
 Sevenoaks Preparatory School
 Sevenoaks School
 Shebbear College
 Sheffield High School
 Sherborne House School
 Sherborne Preparatory School
 Sherborne School
 Sherborne School For Girls
 Sherfield School
 Sherrardswood School, Welwyn
 Shiplake College
 Shoreham College
 Shrewsbury High School
 Shrewsbury House School
 Shrewsbury School
 Sibford School
 Sidcot School
 Silcoates School
 Sir William Perkins's School
 Solihull School
 South Hampstead High School
 Southbank International School
 Spratton Hall School
 Stafford Grammar School
 Staines Preparatory School
 Stamford High School 
 Stamford School
 Stanborough School, Watford
 Stella Maris School
 Stockport Grammar School
 Stoke College
 Stonar School
 Stonyhurst College
 Stonyhurst Saint Mary's Hall
 Stowe School
 Streatham Hill & Clapham High School
 Summer Fields School
 Summerhill School
 Sunderland High School
 Sunningdale School
 Surbiton High School
 Susi Earnshaw Theatre School
 Sussex House School
 Sutton High School
 Sutton Valence School
 The Swedish School in London
 Sydenham High School
 Sylvia Young Theatre School

T
 Talbot Heath School
 Tawhid Boys School
 Tayyibah Girls' School
 Taunton School
 Teesside High School, Stockton-on-Tees
 Teikyo School United Kingdom
 Terra Nova School
 Tettenhall College
 Thetford Grammar School
 Thomas's London Day School
 Thorpe Hall School
 Tonbridge School
 Tormead School
Tower College
 Tower House School
 Towers Convent School
 Town Close House Preparatory School
 Trent College
 Tring Park School for the Performing Arts
 Trinity School, Brentwood
 Trinity School (of John Whitgift)
 Trinity School, Teignmouth, Devon
 Truro High School
 Truro School
 Tudor Hall School
 Twyford School

U
 University College School
 Uplands School
 Uppingham School
 Ursuline Preparatory School

V
 Vernon Lodge Preparatory School
 Vinehall School

W
 Wakefield Girls' High School
 Walhampton School
 Walthamstow Hall
 Warminster School
 Warwick School
 Welbeck Defence Sixth Form College
 Wellesley House School
 Wellingborough School
 Wellington College
 Wellington School, Somerset
 Wells Cathedral School
 West Buckland School
 West Hill Park School
 Westbourne House School
 Westbourne School
 Westbrook Hay School
 Westfield School, Newcastle upon Tyne
 Westholme School
 Westonbirt School
 Westminster Abbey Choir School
 Westminster Cathedral Choir School
 Westminster School
 Westminster Under School
 Wetherby School
 Whitgift School
 Willington School
 Wimbledon High School
 Winchester College
 Windermere School
 Windlesham House School
 Wisbech Grammar School
 Witham Hall
 Withington Girls' School
 Woldingham School
 Wolverhampton Grammar School
 Woodbridge School
 Woodford Green Preparatory School
 Woodhouse Grove School, Leeds/Bradford
 Woodleigh School
 Worksop College
 Worksop College Preparatory School
 Worth School
 Wrekin College
 Wycombe Abbey School, High Wycombe
 Wycliffe College, Gloucestershire
 Wykeham House School

Y
 Yarm School
 Yehudi Menuhin School of Music, Cobham
 York House School

References

External links
 Schools accredited by the Independent Schools Council
 School search
 UK Independent School Directory

Independent schools